The JAC J5 or Heyue Sedan is a compact sedan produced by JAC Motors under the Heyue brand in China

Overview

The JAC Heyue sedan was launched in the Chinese market with prices ranging from 62,800 to 75,800 yuan. 
The Heyue sedan is powered by a 1.5 liter Straight-4 petrol engine and a 1.8 liter straight-4 petrol engine with transmission options including a 5-speed manual transmission and a 5-speed automatic transmission.

2014 facelift
A facelift was revealed in March 2014 featuring restyled front and rear fascias. Prices ranges from 73,800 yuan to 98,800 yuan.

JAC Heyue Sedan Sport Edition
The JAC Heyue Sport Edition was launched on the Chinese car market in May 2012 with a price of 87,800 yuan. It is based on the standard Heyue Sedan while featuring different alloys, a spoiler and a body kit. Engine is the same as in the standard Heyue Sedan.

JAC iEVA50

The JAC iEVA50 is the electric vehicle version of the Heyue Sedan with a NEDC range of 500 kilometers launched in March 2018. The iEVA50 is powered by an electric motor over the front axle with an output of 144 hp. 60-kWh batteries are located under the rear seats. A base trim version with a less powerful battery pack of 47 kWh is also available with a NEDC range of 330 kilometers.

2019 facelift
A facelift was launched in 2019 featuring restyled front and rear end designs.

References

External links 

 (iEVA50)

J5
Cars introduced in 2011
Front-wheel-drive vehicles
Compact cars
Sedans
Cars of China
Production electric cars